Naem Nizam (born 5 November 1965) is a Bangladeshi journalist, writer, philanthropist and the editor of daily Bangladesh Pratidin, the largest circulated Bengali language daily in Bangladesh. He is the Vice President of Sheikh Russell KC,  a professional football club based in Dhaka, Bangladesh, currently playing in the Bangladesh Premier League.  He is the director of East West Media Group. He is the former CEO of News24 and Radio Capital.

Career

Reporter 

Nizam was a political reporter in the 80s.

ATN bangla 
Nizam was one of the founding reporters of ATN Bangla news. Nizam later served as the chief news editor of ATN Bangla. He was the founding news reporter of ATN Bangla.

Bangladesh Pratidin
Nizam is a member of the Editors' Council a grouping of the newspaper editors of Bangladesh. In that capacity he along with other editors including that of Prothom Alo signed a statement demanding the release of Mahmudur Rahman, protesting the raid on newspaper Daily Inqilab and the arrest and harassment of journalists across the Bangladesh. They also criticized the new broadcast policy saying it would harm the freedom of the media.

On 6 July 2014, Nizam attended an iftar hosted by former Prime Minister Khaleda Zia for prominent newspaper editors and journalists.

In March 2015, Nizam received threats from Safiur Rahman Farabi, an Islamic extremist. Farabi was arrested by Rapid Action Battalion and charged under Information and Communication Technology Act. On 11 April 2019, Farabi was acquitted by Judge Ash Sams Joglul Hossai of the Cyber Tribunal Court. On 16 February 2021, Farabi was sentenced to life imprisonment in the Avijit Roy murder case.

Nizam was sued by  Ashikur Rahman Miku, General Secretary of Bangladesh Volleyball Federation following the publication of a critical report about him 18 May 2012. On 3 June 2012, Miku filed a defamation case against him. On 15 September 2015, Senior Judicial Magistrate Md Zakaria of a Narail court issued an arrest warrant against him. Nizam secured bail from the court after appearing before it.

On 16 August 2017, a legal notice was served against Nizam by the Organizing Secretary of the Bangladesh Awami Olama League, Maulana Abdul Jalil, for publishing a column by Taslima Nasreen. On 23 August 2017, Nizam was appointment member of the Bangladesh Press Council.

On 5 October 2017, Nizam was summoned a local Dhaka Court by Metropolitan Magistrate Debabrata Biswas following a case filed by Dhaka Lawyers Association President Saidur Rahman Manik. The case alleged a joke about lawyers in an editorial by Member of Parliament Golam Mawla Rony defamed lawyers. In December 2017, he was sued by reserved Member of Parliament, Lutfunnesa following report on Bangladesh Pratidin on corruption by her and her husband. The Member of Parliament was criticized by Bangladesh Federal Union of Journalists and Dhaka Union of Journalists for filling the case.

An arrest warrant was issued against Nizam in January 2018, following a defamation case filed by Awami League politician and State Minister of Primary and Mass Education, Motahar Hossain. He had filed the defamation case following a report on his corruption published on Bangladesh Pratidin on 9 April 2014. The issue of an arrest warrant was condemned by Bangladesh Federal Union of Journalists and Dhaka Union of Journalists. He is a member of the National Narcotics Control Board. On 22 October 2018, he along with 54 other editors issued a joint statement condemning Mainul Hosein for making offensive remarks against Masuda Bhatti, acting Editor of the Dainik Amader Notun Shomoy, on a live show on Ekattor TV.

In March 2018, Nizam attended an event of Bangladesh Border Guard and Border Security Force near the Bangladesh-India border near Jessore which had been declared a crime free area.

Nizam was given a "tax card" and honored by the National Board of Revenue on 5 November 2018 for being one of the highest tax payers in the journalist category.

On 16 September 2019, Nizam was elected General Secretary of the Editors' Council while Mahfuz Anam was elected president. In a statement of the Editors Council he condemned the usage of Digital Security Act to arrest journalists. In August 2020, a statement issued by the council and signed by Nizam condemned the absence of national newspapers from the "government list of online news portals". The statement said it was unreasonable to require special permission or separate licenses for online versions of national newspapers. He is a member of Newspaper Owners’ Association of Bangladesh.

In 2020, Nizam was awarded the Bashir Ahmed Award. He called on the Ministry of Finance to reduce the import duty on newsprint in a virtual meeting with Finance Minister AHM Mustafa Kamal in April 2021.

Nizam was elected director of Sheikh Russel KC on 29 May 2021. Naem Nizam has been relieved of his duties as the chief executive officer of News 24 and Radio Capital from November 2021 and made a director of the parent company, East West Media Group.

Bibliography 
 TV News (2011)- A guide book on TV journalism and Technical aspects of broadcast journalism based on his experiences.
 BDR Bidroho (2011)
 Ghure Beraye deshe deshe (2015)
 Electronics and Print Journalism (2015)
 Jyotishi Ballen kkhomota Gele Mantri Jele (2015)
 Vromoner Koto Kahini (2016)
 ‘Print Journalism (2016)
 Chander Aloye Mritu Dekha (2016)
 Nirbachito Colum (2017)
 Gano Adalat (2017)- about the Gono Adalat.
 Amar Kichhu Katha (2017)
 Rong Mahal (2018)
 General Moeen ke bidai diyese Pranab (2018)

Personal life
Nizam is married to journalist Farida Yasmin since 1990 and has one son named Mahir Abrar and one daughter named Nujhat Purnata Nizam's wife Farida Yasmin, is a career journalist and journalists’ leader. She was elected the first woman general secretary and president of the National Press Club of Bangladesh. This was a historical victory for news media and women empowerment.

References

Living people
Bangladeshi journalists
People from Comilla
Bangladeshi newspaper editors
1965 births
Tejgaon College alumni
University of Dhaka alumni